Iwaya is a surname. Notable people with the surname include: 

Mihoko Iwaya (born 1964), Japanese footballer
Naomine Iwaya (born 1960), Japanese alpine skier
Takeshi Iwaya (born 1957), Japanese politician
Toru Iwaya (born 1936), Japanese mezzotint engraver and painter

See also
Iwama (disambiguation)

Japanese-language surnames